First Databank (FDB) is a major provider of drug and medical device databases that help inform healthcare professionals to make decisions. FDB partners with information system developers to deliver useful medication- and medical device-related information to clinicians, business associates, and patients. FDB is part of Hearst and the Hearst Health network.

History
First Databank was founded in 1977 as a company that published a quarterly magazine of drug prices. They were bought by Hearst Corporation in 1980. First Databank then evolved to become a provider of clinical and descriptive drug knowledge that is integrated into healthcare information systems globally. FDB has its headquarters in San Francisco, California, and has other offices in Indianapolis, Indiana, Exeter, England, Dubai, UAE and Hyderabad, India.

The firm's drug databases support pharmacy dispensing, formulary management, drug pricing analysis, claims processing, computerized physician order entry (CPOE), electronic health records (EHR), electronic medical records (EMR), electronic prescribing (e-Prescribing), electronic medication administration records (EMAR), population health and telemedicine/telehealth.

Beginning in 2011, First Databank's set of National Drug Codes (NDCs) have been integrated into RxNorm's standard clinical drug vocabulary that includes all medications available on the US market. RxNorm is produced and maintained by the United States National Library of Medicine (NLM).

In 2017, FDB acquired Polygot Systems, which simplifies drug information for patients and translates that information into 21 languages.

In 2018, FDB partnered with PetIQ to release the first veterinary medication database to provide information on pet medications structured for integration into pharmacy systems.

Beginning in 2020, FDB partnered with Amazon and its Alexa devices to provide drug information and answer medication questions.

During the COVID-19 pandemic, FDB posted drug data (regarding remdesivir, chloroquine, and hydroxychloroquine) and medical device-related coronavirus information to its website.

In August 2021, the company announced a partnership with RxRevu to provide integrated decision support tools to improve patient access to care, delivering patient-specific pharmacy benefit information to EHR workflows via direct connections with pharmacy benefit managers. The technology displays accurate, real-time data at the point of prescribing, allowing physicians to find affordable alternatives for medications specific to a patient's health needs and insurance benefits. FDB will offer RxRevu's prescription cost and coverage solution to current and future hospital, health system, and EHR clients.

Operations

FDB MedKnowledge (formerly National Drug Data File Plus)

First Databank's MedKnowledge provides prices, descriptions, and collateral clinical information on drugs approved by the US Food and Drug Administration (FDA), plus unapproved drugs, commonly used over-the-counter drugs, herbal remedies, medical foods and nutritional supplements.

FDB OrderKnowledge (formerly OrderView Med Knowledge Base)

First Databank has developed a drug ordering knowledge base that enables physicians to look up and order drugs. Drug orders are generated based on patient parameters such as age, weight, renal and hepatic impairment, thereby reducing lists of candidate drugs to a minimum. The database is expected to affect the number of adverse drug reactions and side effects at facilities that have adopted the electronic order entry systems.

FDB AlertSpace

A web-based software tool that enables institution-specific modification of medication alerts using FDB MedKnowledge clinical modules based on clinician input, localized clinical experience, and other available evidence. The tool allows users to edit or turn off individual alerts, track all alert customizations and create an audit record, and view FDB updates in comparison with the user's own modifications. Users can load the results of their modifications directly into their medication decision support system for immediate use in the workflow. The approach follows the normal update process.

FDB Prizm

The FDB Prizm medical device database provides structured, categorized, and normalized information about medical device products that are implanted into patients; hospital and durable medical equipment; and medical supplies. The medical device content comes from a variety of sources such as the FDA, medical device manufacturers, and industry data pools. Also, it encompasses additional information from clinical, operational, and financial attributes and codes. Use of this database within supply chain and other information systems is designed to help decision makers to build and maintain device libraries, identify and document medical devices in case of recalls and adverse events, and group and analyze medical device utilization.

Meducation
Meducation comprises simplified medication instructions and medication regimen calendars using patient-specific information from the electronic health record (EHR). All material is written at a 5th to 8th grade reading level with supporting pictograms in more than 20 languages and is designed to help reduce medication errors and improve medication adherence for all patients.

FDB Targeted Medication Warnings
FDB Targeted Medication Warnings provides patient-specific clinical decision support (CDS) for medications and is integrated directly into the EHR workflow. This content uses lab results, risk scores, and other patient data to suggest clinical guidance that is most relevant to the patient context. The CDS derived from this solution provides specificity for clinical decisions and is linked to the related generic medication alerts which can be filtered out/customized using FDB AlertSpace.

FDB Pet MedKnowledge
FDB Pet MedKnowledge is a comprehensive drug database with veterinary FDA approved medications, allowing veterinarians to access pet medication information whenever and wherever is needed. The service is modeled on the FDB MedKnowledge human medication database.

Litigation

A consumer coalition filed separate suits in a Boston, Massachusetts federal court against drug wholesaler McKesson Corporation and First Databank, accusing the companies of artificially inflating drug prices.  The lawsuits say that McKesson and FDB conspired from 2002 through 2005 to set the list prices artificially high.  The suit against First DataBank accused it of limiting its survey of wholesalers to a single company, McKesson.

First Databank agreed to a settlement, tentatively approved by the federal court, in which it would not pay damages to the plaintiffs, but agreed to reduce average wholesale prices (AWPs) listed in its databases by five percent for about 2,033 drugs. McKesson chose to fight the suits.

The settlement required First DataBank (FDB) to reduce the AWP mark-up from 1.25 to 1.20 times the Wholesale Acquisition Cost (WAC) for 1,442 NDCs identified in the litigation. FDB set the mark-up at 1.20 for all drugs independent of the litigation on September 26, 2009. The roll back of the WAC-to-AWP spread led to a 4% reduction in their AWP. FDB also stopped publishing AWP data on September 26, 2011, two years after the rollback adjustments were implemented. First DataBank continues to publish non-AWP drug pricing information, including WAC, Direct Price, and suggested wholesale price.

References

External links
Official website

Publishing companies established in 1982
Hearst Communications publications
Pharmaceutical industry
Pharmaceuticals policy
Publishing companies of the United States
Companies based in San Francisco
1982 establishments in the United States